Freedom of the press is the freedom of communication and expression through mediums.

Freedom of the Press may also refer to:  
 "The Freedom of the Press" (Animal Farm), George Orwell's preface to Animal farm
 Freedom of the Press (report), a yearly report by Freedom House
 Freedom of the Press (film), a 1928 American silent mystery film
 Freedom of the Press Foundation (FPF), a non-profit organization to support freedom of the press 
 Foundation for Press Freedom (FLIP), a non-profit organization to protect threatened journalists in Colombia
 Freedom Press, an anarchist publishing house in the United Kingdom

See also
 International Press Freedom Award (disambiguation)